Solano is a corregimiento in Chiriquí Province in the Republic of Panama.

References 

 

Corregimientos of Chiriquí Province